Goran Jovanović (born 8 May 1977) is a Serbian former footballer who played as a midfielder.

Career
After an unassuming spell at Slavia Mozyr in Belarus, Jovanović played for Mogren in the 2002–03 First League of Serbia and Montenegro, but failed to help them avoid relegation from the top flight. He subsequently joined Sartid Smederevo in June 2003, spending four seasons with the Oklopnici.

In 2007, Jovanović rejoined Mogren to play in the Montenegrin First League. He was a regular member of the team over the next four years, winning two championships in 2009 and 2011.

Honours
Mogren
 Montenegrin First League: 2008–09, 2010–11
 Montenegrin Cup: 2007–08

References

External links
 
 
 

1977 births
Living people
People from Zemun
Serbia and Montenegro footballers
Serbian footballers
Association football midfielders
FK Dinamo Pančevo players
FK Hajduk Kula players
FC Slavia Mozyr players
FK Mogren players
FK Smederevo players
OFK Grbalj players
First League of Serbia and Montenegro players
Belarusian Premier League players
Serbian SuperLiga players
Montenegrin First League players
Serbia and Montenegro expatriate footballers
Serbian expatriate footballers
Expatriate footballers in Belarus
Expatriate footballers in Montenegro
Serbia and Montenegro expatriate sportspeople in Belarus
Serbian expatriate sportspeople in Montenegro